Zootecus insularis is a species of gastropods belonging to the family Achatinidae.

The species is found in Africa and Southwestern Asia.

References

Achatinidae